Angiopathy is the generic term for a disease of the blood vessels (arteries, veins, and capillaries). The best known and most prevalent angiopathy is diabetic angiopathy, a common complication of chronic diabetes.

Classification

By caliber
There are two types of angiopathy: macroangiopathy and microangiopathy.

In macroangiopathy, atherosclerosis and a resultant blood clot forms on the large blood vessels, sticks to the vessel walls, and blocks the flow of blood. Macroangiopathy may cause other complications, such as ischemic heart disease, stroke and peripheral vascular disease which contributes to the diabetic foot ulcers and the risk of amputation.

In microangiopathy, the walls of the smaller blood vessels become so thick and weak that they bleed, leak protein, and slow the flow of blood through the body. The decrease of blood flow through stenosis or clot formation impairs the flow of oxygen to cells and biological tissues (called ischemia) and leads to cellular death (necrosis and gangrene, which in turn may require amputation). Thus, tissues which are very sensitive to oxygen levels, such as the retina, develop microangiopathy and may cause blindness (so-called proliferative diabetic retinopathy). Damage to nerve cells may cause peripheral neuropathy, and to kidney cells, diabetic kidney disease (Kimmelstiel-Wilson syndrome).

By condition
It is also possible to classify angiopathy by the associated condition:
 Diabetic angiopathy
 Cerebral amyloid angiopathy

References

Vascular diseases